Palau participated in the 2010 Summer Youth Olympics in Singapore.

The Palau squad consisted of 4 athletes competing in 3 sports: aquatics (swimming), athletics and weightlifting.

Athletics

Boys
Track and Road Events

Girls
Track and Road Events

Swimming

Girls'

Weightlifting

Boys

References

External links
Competitors List: Palau

Nations at the 2010 Summer Youth Olympics
Youth
Palau at the Youth Olympics